Ashprihanal Pekka Aalto (born August 27, 1970) is a Finnish ultramarathon runner  who began running as a hobby at age 25. He currently works as a courier. Aalto is a member of The Sri Chinmoy Marathon Team. In 2006, Tarja Halonen, the President of Finland, recognized  him as an "International Ambassador of Sport".

History 
In 1999, he started running multi-day races. He ranked all-time second at the 3100-mile Race in 2006. Aalto is a three-time champion of The Self-Transcendence Six Day Race in New York City. For three straight years he ran all three yearly Self-Transcendence multidays in New York (six days, 700 miles).

Races

References

Further reading 
Film
 Rawal,Sanjay : 3100: Run and Become, Eng. 2018, IMDb 4936398, 79 minutes

External links 
MultidayWiki 
Video: Fox, 2015
Video: Finish 3100-Mile Race 2011
Video: Six Day Run (trailer)
 

Finnish male marathon runners
Finnish ultramarathon runners
Living people
Devotees of Sri Chinmoy
1970 births
Male ultramarathon runners